"Reisefieber" (Travel nerves, lit. Travel fever) is a song by Die Toten Hosen. It's the only single and the fourth track from their debut album Opel-Gang.

The song is about a man who likes to travel a lot and is adventurous, but goes too far to sea and is killed by a wave. A while after the discovery of his body, everything goes on normally for everyone else.

There's also an English version of the song, titled "Seafever".

Music video
The video was directed by Jörg Sonntag. In the video, the band is having a picnic in a stormy weather.

Track listing
 "Reisefieber" (Breitkopf, Frege, von Holst, Meurer, Trimpop/Frege) − 3:46
 "Niemandsland" (No one's land) (Frege, von Holst/Frege) − 2:41

1982 singles
Songs written by Michael Breitkopf
Die Toten Hosen songs
Songs written by Campino (singer)
Songs written by Andreas von Holst
1982 songs